Pronoe (Ancient Greek: Προνόη Pronóē means 'forethought') refers to six characters in Greek mythology.
 Pronoe, one of the 50 Nereids, marine-nymph daughters of the 'Old Man of the Sea' Nereus and the Oceanid Doris. Her name means "the provident" or "bewailing, complaining". 
 Pronoe, daughter of Phorbus. She married King Aetolus of Aetolia and bore him Pleuron and Calydon.
 Pronoe, an Argive princess as daughter of King Melampus of Argos, and Iphianeira, daughter of Megapenthes. She was considered to be a seer.
 Pronoe, daughter of the river god Asopus, mother of Phocus by Poseidon.
Pronoe, a Naiad of a river in Lycia. She told Caunus what had happened to his sister Byblis (that she had killed herself), and persuaded him to stay with her on condition that he receive rulership of the country of Lycia or Caria. The couple had a son Aegialus who inherited the kingdom upon his father's death.
Pronoe, a nymph mother of the Trojan Lassus. This son was killed by Podalirius during the Trojan war.

Notes

References 

 Apollodorus, The Library with an English Translation by Sir James George Frazer, F.B.A., F.R.S. in 2 Volumes, Cambridge, MA, Harvard University Press; London, William Heinemann Ltd. 1921. . Online version at the Perseus Digital Library. Greek text available from the same website.
Conon, Fifty Narrations, surviving as one-paragraph summaries in the Bibliotheca (Library) of Photius, Patriarch of Constantinople translated from the Greek by Brady Kiesling. Online version at the Topos Text Project.
 Diodorus Siculus, The Library of History translated by Charles Henry Oldfather. Twelve volumes. Loeb Classical Library. Cambridge, Massachusetts: Harvard University Press; London: William Heinemann, Ltd. 1989. Vol. 3. Books 4.59–8. Online version at Bill Thayer's Web Site
 Diodorus Siculus, Bibliotheca Historica. Vol 1-2. Immanel Bekker. Ludwig Dindorf. Friedrich Vogel. in aedibus B. G. Teubneri. Leipzig. 1888-1890. Greek text available at the Perseus Digital Library.
 Hard, Robin, The Routledge Handbook of Greek Mythology: Based on H.J. Rose's "Handbook of Greek Mythology", Psychology Press, 2004. . Google Books.
 Hesiod, Theogony from The Homeric Hymns and Homerica with an English Translation by Hugh G. Evelyn-White, Cambridge, MA.,Harvard University Press; London, William Heinemann Ltd. 1914. Online version at the Perseus Digital Library. Greek text available from the same website.
 Kerényi, Carl, The Gods of the Greeks, Thames and Hudson, London, 1951.
Quintus Smyrnaeus, The Fall of Troy translated by Way. A. S. Loeb Classical Library Volume 19. London: William Heinemann, 1913. Online version at theio.com
 Quintus Smyrnaeus, The Fall of Troy. Arthur S. Way. London: William Heinemann; New York: G.P. Putnam's Sons. 1913. Greek text available at the Perseus Digital Library.

Nereids
Naiads
Women of Poseidon
Aetolian characters in Greek mythology